Wario Land II is a 1998 platform video game developed and published by Nintendo for the Game Boy. It was later re-released and optimised for the Game Boy Color. In the game, Wario has to recover his treasure from Captain Syrup. The Game Boy Color version was released for the Nintendo 3DS Virtual Console in 2012.

Gameplay

Unlike in most video games of the time, the game's challenge comes mostly through impeding player progress by implementing physical obstacles, puzzle-solving, paths blocked by coin or treasure locks, or forcing Wario back to previously-visited areas. By finding hidden exits in some stages, the player can change the direction of the game's plot and uncover different endings, as well as find more treasure. In addition to the Really Final Chapter, five other endings can be unlocked by collecting all the treasures. An enemy-themed Simon Says minigame based on the Game & Watch game Flagman can be unlocked by collecting all the picture tiles. Wario does not have any life points and cannot die; some enemy attacks simply knock him backward and cause him to drop some coins. He can take advantage of certain enemy attacks however to undergo transformations which allow him to reach areas that he cannot normally get to. For example, exposure to fire makes Wario run around and later become entirely engulfed by flames, which allows him to defeat enemies on contact. In contrast to its predecessor, the game does not have a time limit, which allows the player to explore the areas in unlimited time, a feature which is incorporated in subsequent installments.

Plot
The game features the return of Wario's nemesis, Captain Syrup. Early one morning, she and a few of her soldiers, the Pirate Gooms, sneak into Wario's castle and cause havoc. They steal his precious treasure, set off his giant alarm clock, and leave the tap running, flooding much of his castle. After Wario wakes up and figures out what's going on, he gives chase across the surrounding lands.

Reception

Wario Land II received critical acclaim. The Game Boy Color version received an aggregate score of 88.04% at GameRankings based on 14 reviews. IGN gave the game 9 out of 10, insisting that "It's the perfect game to accompany you on a long road trip because of its lastability and replayability." Power Unlimited gave the Game Boy version a score of 77% writing: "A real jump & run platform as only Nintendo makes them, but which is a bit different. Many levels and you can't die! But this is nonchalant." Nintendo Life awarded the Virtual Console re-release 9 out of 10, arguing that "Big fans of the first game might lament Wario Land II's sudden significant change in gameplay, but if you give it a try, you'll find that it's actually quite good." In 2019, PC Magazine included Wario Land II on their "The 10 Best Game Boy Games".''

Notes

References

External links
Official website 

1998 video games
1999 video games
Game Boy games
Game Boy Color games
Nintendo Research & Development 1 games
Platform games
Video game sequels
Video games developed in Japan
Virtual Console games
Virtual Console games for Nintendo 3DS
Wario Land
Single-player video games
Video games about pirates
Video games set in castles
Video games with alternate endings